Aneta Mihaly (later Marin; born 23 September 1957) is a retired Romanian rower. She mostly competed in quadruple sculls, winning three medals at the world championships in 1977–1981 and placing fourth at the 1980 Olympics. At the 1984 Olympics she competed in eights and won a silver medal.

References

External links 
 
 
 
 
 

1957 births
Living people
Romanian female rowers
Rowers at the 1980 Summer Olympics
Rowers at the 1984 Summer Olympics
Olympic silver medalists for Romania
Olympic rowers of Romania
Olympic medalists in rowing
World Rowing Championships medalists for Romania
Medalists at the 1984 Summer Olympics